The 1955 season was the forty-fourth season for Santos FC.

References

External links
Official Site 

Santos
1955
1955 in Brazilian football